Martin Elementary School may refer to:
 Martin Elementary School (Santa Ana, California)
 Martin Elementary School (Bronwood, Georgia), a National Register of Historic Places listing in Terrell County, Georgia
 Martin Elementary School, a school in the Consolidated School District 158 in Lake in the Hills, Illinois
 George R. Martin Elementary School, a school in Seekonk, Massachusetts
 Martin Elementary School (Laredo, Texas), a school in the Laredo Independent School District
 Martin Elementary School (Green Bay, Wisconsin), a school in Green Bay, Wisconsin
 Martin Elementary School (South San Francisco, California), a school in the South San Francisco Unified School District in South San Francisco, California
Marvin Elementary School (San Diego, California)